Mirafuentes (Basque: Iturriaga) is a town and municipality located in the province and autonomous community of Navarre, northern Spain.

This town is close to the Codés mountain range, part of which falls within its municipal term.

References

External links
 MIRAFUENTES in the Bernardo Estornés Lasa - Auñamendi Encyclopedia (Euskomedia Fundazioa) 

Municipalities in Navarre